Caladenia major, commonly known as the waxlip orchid, parson-in-the-pulpit, or purple cockatoo is a plant in the orchid family Orchidaceae, and is endemic to Australia. It is a ground orchid with a single hairy leaf and one or two purple to mauve flowers. It has been known as Glossodia major since its description by the prolific Scottish botanist Robert Brown in 1810, but recent discoveries suggest its inclusion in the genus Caladenia.

Description
Caladenia major is a terrestrial, perennial, deciduous, herbaceous plant with an underground tuber. The sepals and petals are purple to mauve except for their bases which are white with purple spots. Rarely, the flowers are all white. At the base of the labellum there is a purple, cylinder-shaped appendage with two yellow, fleshy lobes on top. Flowering occurs from August to November.

Taxonomy and naming
The waxlip orchid was first formally described in 1810 by Robert Brown who gave it the name Glossodia major and published the description in Prodromus Florae Novae Hollandiae. In 2015, as a result of studies of molecular phylogenetics, Mark Clements changed the name to Caladenia major. The specific epithet (major) is a Latin word meaning "greater".

Glossodia major is regarded as a synonym of the name Caladenia major which is accepted by the Royal Botanic Gardens, Kew.

Distribution and habitat
Caladenia major occurs in all states of Australia except Western Australia and the Northern Territory. In New South Wales it is widespread and common in the eastern half of the state; in Victoria it is also widespread and common in most areas with suitable habitat; in South Australia it is common in the south-east, sometimes forming extensive colonies; in Tasmania it is widespread and common and in Queensland it grows in the south-east of that state. This orchid is found in a range of habitats from coastal heath to woodland and dry open forest.

References

major
Plants described in 1810
Endemic orchids of Australia
Orchids of New South Wales
Orchids of Queensland
Orchids of South Australia
Orchids of Tasmania
Orchids of Victoria (Australia)